Psycho+Logical-Records is an independent record label based in New York City. Founded in 1999 by rapper and producer Necro, its first release was Necro's debut I Need Drugs. It went on to release notable albums by hip hop artists such as the debut solo albums of Ill Bill, Sabac Red, & Goretex of Non Phixion, as well as Mr. Hyde. Releases are distributed on CD & digitally through formats such as iTunes, and several albums and singles have been released on 12" vinyl as well. Among the label's current artists are Necro and Mr Hyde, and the label as of 2014 has released 42 albums.

History

1999-01: Founding, first releases 
Psycho+Logical-Records is a record label owned by rapper Necro, and operating in New York City. Psycho+Logical-Records started off in November 1999 as a means through which Necro could release his debut album, I Need Drugs, in 2000. The label was named after the concept that it is logical for acts to be psychotic. Before selling the album online, he would sell hard-copies to fans at shows and on the streets. According to Necro, at one point in 1999 he had around 100 international fans selling the CDs he'd personally pressed, writing that "they would sell it for $13, and give me $8 a CD, and keep $5 a CD." He states he was first inspired to sell records this way by reading interviews with Master P.

I Need Drugs officially was released in stores in 2000, and afterwards Necro signed a deal for both the Psycho+Logical imprint and the album with Landspeed Distribution. The original $125,000 contract was downsized after Landspeed claimed they were low on funds, and the album received less promotion than originally planned. To help compensate, Necro writes that he gave "1,000's of I Need Drugs sampler cassettes" to fans for free, often mailing them as a promotion.

I Need Drugs was followed by his 2000 album Instrumentals Vol. 1, and the following year he released the compilation album The Early Years: Rare Demos '91–'94 by his collaborator and brother Ill Bill. The Early Years: Rare Demos '91–'94 is the first rarities released under Psycho+Logical-Records. Featured guests on the compilation include Non Phixion and Circle of Tyrants member Goretex. These tracks where recorded between 1991 and 1994. Necro went on to release several more albums in 2001, including Gory Days with Select-O-Hits as a distributor. The label has a long history of releasing instrumental albums to accompany major studio releases, such as Gory Days Instrumentals in 2003.

2003–09: Increased output 
The first wave of albums released on Necro's label were entirely produced by Necro himself. This includes the debut solo albums of Non Phixion members Ill Bill, Sabac Red and Goretex after he already produced 7 songs for Non Phixion's debut album The Future Is Now in 2002 and Non Phixion's The Green CD in 2004, and two albums for label member Mr Hyde. "What's Wrong with Bill?" is Ill Bill's debut studio album, released on March 2, 2004, by Psycho+Logical. The album spawned one single, "The Anatomy of a School Shooting", and a music video for "Chasing the Dragon". Necro produced the entire album. The label has also previously worked with groups such as Non Phixion (Goretex, ill Bill, Sabac Red), with whom Necro formed the supergroup Secret Society and released an album on the label.

Circle of Tyrants was an underground hip hop group signed to the label consisting of Necro, Ill BIll, Mr Hyde and Goretex. The group only released one album, named "The Circle of Tyrants" which was released in 2005. Necro produced all tracks on this album. Goretex released several albums on Psycho-Logical but left after being kicked out of Non Phixion. After the group disbanded, other members went on to release solo projects, several on Psycho-Logical as well.

Q-Unique was associated with the label for a time, as was the rapper Nems, who was originally going to release Prezident's Day on the label, but eventually released it under Creative Juices as Necro was having difficulties with E1 Music at the time.

2010–14: Recent years 
Recent albums include The Murder Murder Kill Kill EP by Necro, released in August 2012 and featuring the appearance of Kool G Rap. Necro had a collaboration on the label with The Godfathers and Kool G Rap in 2013. As of 2014 the major artists associated with the label include Mr. Hyde and Necro.

Distribution 
The label has a history of using several distributors, first with Landspeed Distribution for the first year, and then E1 Music and Fontana Distribution. In 2012 the label became associated with the distribution INgrooves. As of 2014 the entire Psycho+Logical-Records catalog is available on iTunes listed under Necro, as well as 300 other national and international digital outlets. CD and vinyl prints of several releases can be obtained via stores.

Artists 
Current
 Necro
 Mr Hyde

Past
 Circle Of Tyrants
 Goretex
Ill Bill
 Nems
 Q-Unique
 Riviera Regime
 Sabac Red
 Sean Strange
 Secret Society (Non Phixion and Necro)

Discography

Albums

12" singles

Further reading 
Discographies
Psycho+Logical-Records at Allmusic
Psycho+Logical-Records at Discogs

See also 
 List of record labels

References

External links 
NecroProduct.com
Psycho+Logical-Records on Facebook

 
American record labels
Hip hop record labels
Record labels established in 1999
Horrorcore record labels
Hardcore hip hop record labels
1999 establishments in New York City